is a 1993 Japanese biographical drama film directed by Shinichiro Sawai about the life of pianist Rentarō Taki.

Cast
 Tōru Kazama as Rentarō Taki
 Isako Washio as Yuki Nakano
 Yuko Asano as Misako
 Hiroshi Katsuno as Daikichi Taki
 Takaaki Enoki as Tōson Shimazaki
 Kyōhei Shibata as Kōda Rohan
 Gō Katō as Yoshihiro Taki

Awards
17th Japan Academy Prize
Nominated: Best Film
Nominated: Best Director - Shinichirō Sawai
Nominated: Best Screenplay
Nominated: Best Actor - Tōru Kazama
Nominated: Best Actress - Isako Washio
Nominated: Best Supporting Actress - Fumi Dan

15th Yokohama Film Festival
Won: Best Actress - Isako Washio
5th Best Film

References

External links
 

1993 films
Films about pianos and pianists
Films directed by Shinichirō Sawai
Japanese biographical drama films
1990s Japanese films